The black-soil ctenotus (Ctenotus joanae)  is a species of skink found in the Northern Territory and Queensland in Australia.

References

joanae
Reptiles described in 1970
Taxa named by Glen Milton Storr